The Unified Buddhist Sangha of Vietnam (Giáo hội Phật giáo Việt Nam Thống nhất or GHPGVNTN or  Unified Buddhist Church of Vietnam (UBCV) ) is a Buddhist organization in Vietnam. The Unified Buddhist Sangha of Vietnam was founded in 1964 to unify 11 of the 14 different sects of Vietnamese Buddhism which were present in South Vietnam at the time. The unification also came in response to Diệm government's increasing hostility against Buddhists during the Vietnam War.

The UBSV's patriarchs Thích Huyền Quang, and Thích Quảng Độ were under house arrest due to their  opposition to strict government control of religion, which was established after the communists won the war in 1975.

In 1981, six years after the communist victory, the new government consolidated all Buddhist organizations under the umbrella group Buddhist Sangha of Vietnam and placed it under government control. The Unified Buddhist Church of Vietnam and all other non-sanctioned organizations were banned within Vietnam. It continues to operate in exile outside Vietnam.

See also
Thích Quảng Độ

References

Bibliography

External links
The Suppression of the Unified Buddhist Church, Human Rights Watch 1995

Buddhism in Vietnam
Buddhist organizations in Asia
Religious organizations established in 1964